The Soul Seekers (with the full name "The Famous Original Soul Seekers Spiritual Singers of New Orleans,") is a gospel group based in New Orleans, Louisiana, United States from 1939 to the 1960s.

Organized and founded in 1939 by Mr. Ernest Irvin in New Orleans, Louisiana, this quartet gospel recording group is famous throughout the world for their powerful, triumphant renditions of spirituals, old and new.  At the time of their first album release, Spirituals (1959) on MGM subsidiary Cub Records, Irvin and The Soul Seekers had appeared at St. Paul's Cathedral, in London, and performed at over 600 theatres and churches back in the United States.

The original six members of this sextet included Arthur Blake, Ernest Irvin, Alex "Junior" Bolton, Carneil Underwood, guitarist, Wallace Meyers, and dynamic lead singer, Marion Hannah.  The Soul Seekers released two more albums on Savoy Records' Gospel record label and on Choice Records, SOUND OF AMERICA, in the 1960s.  The latter two albums included new members, guitarists Richard and Frankie Boyce, songwriter Larry Lawson, and vocalist George Washington. The Soul Seekers' second album is Songs For My Mother. The DeVoil Brothers, Johnny and Wimbley, joined the group as well for the third album, Tell It Like It Is, a social commentary written by Larry Lawson describing issues that still plague the Black church today. The group is also known as "The Soul Seekers featuring Rev. Marion Hannah".

The new group of Soul Seekers (California) were organized by producer "Baby Dubb," and signed to MY BLOCK RECORDS, INC. by Jaha Johnson.  They carry on the Holy Ghost quartet tradition with pride. "It's All God!"  They have won Stellar Awards and have released two albums.  Soul Seekers,in 2005 and Soul Seekers II, 2011.  There are 9 singers in the new group, and songwriter, Lenny Lawson, is the son of Original Soul Seekers' Larry Lawson. The current single is “It’s All God,” featuring Pastor Marvin L. Winans, but other strong tracks on SS II include “Come On Jesus” and "Take Your Burdens." "Come On Jesus" sounds like the early 1960s quartet in an outing dressed up for the new millennium. Similarly, “Take Your Burdens” features tight, exquisite and soulful harmonies sung to a solitary electric guitar accompaniment until halfway through, when bass, drums and a warbling B3 enter the picture. By bringing back the electric 1960s proto-soul sound on these two tracks, the Soul Seekers sound more traditional than many traditional groups on the gospel highway these days.  The Soul Seekers Legacy continues and the Throne of David is secure!

References

External links

http://www.thesoulseekersmusic.com/

Suggested reading
The Gospel Discography 1943-1970 by Cedric Hayes and Bob Laughton, published by Eyeball Productions, Inc., West Vancouver, British Columbia, Canada

American gospel musical groups
Musical groups established in 1939